Abul Bashar is a popular Bengali writer from the state of West Bengal in India. He was born in 1951 in village & Post Office- Tekaraipur ,P.S- Islampur,subdivision|Domkal]], Murshidabad district. Bashar is pro Trinamool so called intellectual.

Select bibliography
Agnibalaka
Phool Bou 1988
Marusvarga 1991
Bhorer Proshuti
Saidabai
Simar
Mati chere jai
Surer Sampan
Vetore Aste Dao
Sporser Baire
Akaslina
Jol, Mati, Aguner Upakkhayan
Madhabsundori
Naram Hridoyer Chinho
Pobitro Asukh
Paanikayed
Anna Nakshi
Dharmer Grahon
Suchitra Sen
Ekti Khame Bhora Kahini
Bhor Poati Tara

Awards
Ananda Purashkar, (1988) 
, Sahitya-Shiromoni Purashkar (1993) and
Bankim Smriti Purashkar (2008).
Banga Bhushan 2022.

References 

A list of books by Abul Bashar

Bengali writers
Bengali-language writers
People from Murshidabad district
1951 births
Living people
Recipients of the Ananda Purashkar
University of Calcutta alumni
20th-century Indian novelists
Novelists from West Bengal
Writers from West Bengal